In epistemology, descriptive knowledge (also known as propositional knowledge, knowing-that, declarative knowledge, or constative knowledge) is knowledge that can be expressed in a declarative sentence or an indicative proposition. "Knowing-that" can be contrasted with "knowing-how" (also known as "procedural knowledge"), which is knowing how to perform some task, including knowing how to perform it skillfully. 

It can also be contrasted with "knowing of" (better known as "knowledge by acquaintance"), which is non-propositional knowledge of something which is constituted by familiarity with it or direct awareness of it. By definition, descriptive knowledge is knowledge of particular facts, as potentially expressed by our theories, concepts, principles, schemas, and ideas. The descriptive knowledge that a person possesses constitute their understanding of the world and the way that it works.

The distinction between knowing-how and knowing-that was brought to prominence in epistemology by Gilbert Ryle who used it in his book The Concept of Mind. For Ryle, the former differs in its emphasis and purpose, since it is primarily practical knowledge, whereas the latter focuses on indicative or explanatory knowledge.

See also
 Explicit knowledge
 Conversazione

References

External links
Knowledge by Acquaintance vs. Description. Entry from the Stanford Encyclopedia of Philosophy.
Knowledge How. Entry from the Stanford Encyclopedia of Philosophy.

Knowledge